Barbonymus sunieri is a species of cyprinid fish endemic to the island of Borneo where it is only known from the northeastern portion of the island.  This species can reach a length of  TL.

References

sunieri
Fish described in 1916